Meanguera del Golfo is a municipality in the La Unión department of El Salvador.

Three countries - Honduras, El Salvador, and Nicaragua - have coastline along the gulf, and all three have been involved in a lengthy dispute over the rights to the gulf and the islands located there within.  In 1992, a chamber of the International Court of Justice (ICJ) decided the Land, Island and Maritime Frontier Dispute, of which the gulf dispute was a part.  The ICJ determined that El Salvador, Honduras, and Nicaragua were to share control of the Gulf of Fonseca. El Salvador was awarded the islands of Meanguera and Meanguerita, and Honduras was awarded El Tigre Island.

Current Mayor: Since 2012-2015 Luis Dheming-Almendarez

References

External links

Islands of El Salvador
Territorial disputes of Honduras
Territorial disputes of El Salvador
El Salvador–Honduras border
Municipalities of the La Unión Department